
Shamshad may refer to:

Given name
Shamshad Ahmad, veteran Pakistani diplomat, international relations expert and an author
Shamshad Akhtar, Pakistani development economist, diplomat and intellectual
Shamshad Begum (1919–2013), Indian singer in the Hindi film industry
Shamshad Begum (social worker), Indian social worker
Shamshad Hussain (1946–2015), Indian artist
Shamshad Khan, Manchester based, Leeds born, poet

Surname
Rizwan Shamshad (born 1972), Indian first class cricketer

Other
PB Shamshad, foreign military base in Helmand Province, Afghanistan
Shamshad TV, satellite television station in Afghanistan, launched in early 2006
Tolombeh-ye Shamshad Chah Jelali, village in Pariz Rural District, Pariz District, Sirjan County, Kerman Province, Iran

See also
Shams (disambiguation)
Shamshabad
Shamshadin